North Augusta High School is a four-year public high school located in North Augusta, South Carolina.  Approximately 1,500 students attend the school. The school offers over thirty student organizations. North Augusta is an AP Magnet School and is partnered with the National Math and Science Initiative to provide various programs, resources, and help to students enrolled in AP courses at the school.

Athletics 

North Augusta High School's mascot is the Yellow Jacket. They compete in SCHSL Region 5-4A. The school fields over twenty-five varsity and junior varsity teams. North Augusta High is also home to sporting leagues such as football, baseball, softball, cross country, track and field, basketball, tennis, golf, Wrestling, swim team, and soccer.

State championships 
 Baseball: 1949, 1997
 Basketball - Girls: 2017, 2018, 2019, 2020, 2023
 Football: 1957, 1960, 1989
 Golf - Boys: 1973, 1982, 1983
 Softball: 2022
 Track - Boys: 1952
 Volleyball: 1970

Renovation and New Construction 
In 2014, a multi-phase renovation project began at the school to update existing facilities and to construct new buildings. In January 2015, "Phase 1" was completed when the new 45,000 square foot Math and Science building was finished. "Phase 2A" was completed in November 2015 with the completion of 125,000 square foot building containing classrooms, the "Freshman Academy", a new media center, and a dining room. "Phase 2B" added a new wing for English, Math, Foreign Language, and Social Study classrooms and was completed in October 2019. The final phase, "Phase 3" included a new "arena style" basketball gymnasium, choral/band/orchestral rooms, and a new band field and was completed in Spring 2021.  The only pre-2014 school building that remains is the auditorium.

Notable alumni
Matt Hazel, NFL wide receiver
Craig Baynham, NFL halfback
Charley Britt, NFL defensive back and actor
Matt Campbell, NFL offensive lineman
Tyler Colvin, Major League Baseball player
Fred Vinson, NFL defensive back
Charlie Waters, NFL player and coach
Scott Brown, PGA Tour winner
Skilyr Hicks (singer), America's Got Talent contestant

References

External links 
 Official website
 Alumni Website

Public high schools in South Carolina
Schools in Aiken County, South Carolina
North Augusta, South Carolina